The Orchestral Tubular Bells is an orchestral version of Mike Oldfield's album Tubular Bells, arranged by David Bedford and recorded in 1974 by the Royal Philharmonic Orchestra, featuring Oldfield himself playing the guitar. Excerpts from the album were featured in the 1979 NASA film, The Space Movie. It peaked at #17 on the UK Albums Chart in 1975.

In 2000 it was reissued by Virgin as a HDCD and is the only one of Oldfield's 1970s albums yet to be reissued by Mercury Records.

Differences from the original Tubular Bells 
The main difference between Tubular Bells and the orchestrated version is that Oldfield does not perform the majority of instruments himself; he only plays an overdubbed guitar.  All of the melodies from Tubular Bells are the same, although transferred to different instruments.  Vocal chords were not performed as vocals and there is no 'Master of Ceremonies' reading out the instruments at the end of part one.

In 1975 New Musical Express described the album as a logical extension of the piece. However, Oldfield himself was not happy with Bedford's orchestrated interpretation of his work, as he stated in his autobiography, Changeling.

Recording 
The Orchestral Tubular Bells was performed and recorded live at the Barking Town Hall in September 1974 by the Royal Philharmonic Orchestra.  This was shown on a British television station, BBC Two, with Steve Hillage (of Gong) playing guitar.  Oldfield later added his playing to the album by overdubbing his acoustic guitar at Worcester Cathedral.

The Orchestral Tubular Bells was not the only Mike Oldfield album that was orchestrated at the time, David Bedford also wrote the score for Oldfield's second album, Hergest Ridge.  However, The Orchestral Hergest Ridge was never released to the public as an album. Excerpts from The Orchestral Hergest Ridge were also featured in the 1979 NASA film, The Space Movie.

Album cover 
The album artwork depicts the "bent bell tube" image from Tubular Bells, originally by Trevor Key, in a partly blue/grey box, surrounded by a black border. Some later releases from 2003 have had the bell on a yellow/orange skyscape.

Live performances 

Bedford's orchestration was performed by the BBC Concert Orchestra, conducted by Michael Seal and again featuring Steve Hillage, for a concert marking what would have been Bedford's 80th year. A recording was broadcast by BBC Radio 3 in November 2018.

Track listing 
All selections written and composed by Mike Oldfield.

Side one 
 "The Orchestral Tubular Bells, Part 1" – 26:32

Side two 
 "The Orchestral Tubular Bells, Part 2" – 24:29

Charts

References

External links 
 MikeOldfieldOfficial.com – The official Mike Oldfield website 
 Mike Oldfield Discography - The Orchestral Tubular Bells at Tubular.net

Mike Oldfield live albums
Royal Philharmonic Orchestra albums
1975 live albums
Virgin Records live albums
Orchestral music